Peter Douglas Parker (born 20 July 1959) is an Australian Test cricket match umpire. He was member of the International Panel of ICC Umpires between 2003 and 2008.

Playing career
Parker played junior representative cricket for Queensland before playing in Brisbane Grade Cricket. He gave up playing when he broke his thumb twice in a season.

Umpiring career
He umpired ten Test matches between 1993 and 2008.  His first match was between Australia and New Zealand at Brisbane on 3 December to 7 December 1993, won by Australia by an innings and 96 runs, with Allan Border and Steve Waugh scoring centuries, and Shane Warne and Craig McDermott taking 8 and 6 wickets respectively.  Parker's partner was Steve Randell.

Parker's last Test match in Australia was between Australia and the West Indies at Perth  on 1 December to 3 December 2000, won by Australia by an innings and 27 runs with Mark Waugh scoring a century, and wickets being shared by Glenn McGrath (who took a hat-trick),  Brett Lee, Jason Gillespie and Stuart MacGill.  Parker's partner was the English umpire John Hampshire. Parker retired to focus on his career away from the game in October 2008.

See also
 List of Test cricket umpires
 List of One Day International cricket umpires
 List of Twenty20 International cricket umpires

References

External links
 
 ICC International Panel

1959 births
Living people
Australian Test cricket umpires
Australian One Day International cricket umpires
Australian Twenty20 International cricket umpires